Aspicilia humida is a species of saxicolous (rock-dwelling) and crustose lichen in the family Megasporaceae. As a member of the Aspicilia cinerea species group, it is most closely related to that lichen as well as A. dudinensis, A. laevata, and A. indissimilis. Found in South Korea, it was formally described as a new species in 2022 by Beeyoung Gun Lee. The lichen is only known to occur at the type locality. The specific epithet humida refers to the lichen's habitat, humid wetlands. Similar species include A. aquatica, A. vulcanica and A. pseudovulcanica.

References

Pertusariales
Lichen species
Lichens described in 2022
Lichens of Asia